"Shell Shocked" is a song by American musicians Juicy J, Wiz Khalifa, and Ty Dolla $ign featuring fellow American musicians Kill the Noise and Madsonik, created for the 2014 film Teenage Mutant Ninja Turtles. The song also features uncredited vocals from singer Moxie Raia. It was released in July 2014.

While Madsonik (Brian Tyler) composed the score for Teenage Mutant Ninja Turtles, he was asked to create a song for the film's credits. At first he invited Kill the Noise for an electronic track, and the result had what Madsonik described as "this groove going, and it sounded more like a hip-hop song". Thus they decided to invite some of their favorite rappers, and attracted Juicy J, Wiz Khalifa, and Ty Dolla Sign given they liked the track and were fans of the Ninja Turtles.

Music video
A music video for the song was released on July 29, 2014.

Chart performance

Certifications

References

External links

2014 songs
2014 singles
Wiz Khalifa songs
Juicy J songs
Ty Dolla Sign songs
Kill the Noise songs
Songs written by Ty Dolla Sign
Songs written by Wiz Khalifa
Songs written by Juicy J
Teenage Mutant Ninja Turtles music
Teenage Mutant Ninja Turtles (2014 film series)
Atlantic Records singles

Electro house songs